James Mitchell Cleamons (born September 13, 1949) is an American former professional basketball player and current coach.

Playing career 
He played collegiately at the Ohio State University, and was selected by the Los Angeles Lakers with the 13th pick of the 1971 NBA draft.  He had a nine-year NBA career for four teams (the Los Angeles Lakers, the Cleveland Cavaliers, the New York Knicks, and the Washington Bullets). In 1976, Cleamons was selected to the NBA All-Defense 2nd team.

Coaching career 
Cleamons worked as an assistant coach for the Chicago Bulls from 1989 to 1996. He was the head coach of the Dallas Mavericks for slightly over one year, from 1996 to 1997.  He was then the head coach of the Chicago Condors of the American Basketball league, a short-lived women's professional basketball league in the mid Nineties. He also served as an assistant coach for the Los Angeles Lakers and New Orleans/Oklahoma City Hornets. For a few games during his tenure with the Lakers, he served as acting head coach while Phil Jackson was absent.

In 2011, Cleamons became a coach in the Chinese Basketball Association. In 2013, he became an assistant with the Milwaukee Bucks.

In 2014, Cleamons joined the New York Knicks coaching staff under Derek Fisher.

In 2017, Cleamons accepted a position as an assistant coach for the Yeshiva University of Los Angeles (YULA) high school boys basketball team.

Head coaching record

College

NBA

|-
| align="left" |Dallas
| align="left" |
|82||24||58||.293|| align="center" |5th in Midwest||—||—||—||—
| align="center" |Missed Playoffs
|-
| align="left" |Dallas
| align="left" |
|16||4||12||.250|| align="center" |(fired)||—||—||—||—
| align="center" |—
|-class="sortbottom"
| align="left" |Career
| ||98||28||70||.286|| ||—||—||—||—

References

External links

 BasketballReference.com: Jim Cleamons (as coach)
 BasketballReference.com: Jim Cleamons (as player)

1949 births
Living people
African-American basketball coaches
African-American basketball players
American expatriate basketball people in China
American men's basketball players
Basketball coaches from North Carolina
Basketball players from North Carolina
Cleveland Cavaliers players
Chicago Bulls assistant coaches
Dallas Mavericks head coaches
Dallas Mavericks expansion draft picks
Furman Paladins men's basketball coaches
Los Angeles Lakers assistant coaches
Los Angeles Lakers draft picks
Los Angeles Lakers players
Milwaukee Bucks assistant coaches
New Orleans Hornets assistant coaches
New York Knicks assistant coaches
New York Knicks players
Ohio State Buckeyes men's basketball coaches
Ohio State Buckeyes men's basketball players
People from Lincolnton, North Carolina
Washington Bullets players
Youngstown State Penguins men's basketball coaches
Guards (basketball)
21st-century African-American people
20th-century African-American sportspeople